The Atlas Peak AVA is an American Viticultural Area located within Napa Valley AVA just northeast of the city of Napa. The appellation sits on a higher elevation than most of Napa's wine region which limits the effects of the cool fog coming in from Pacific Ocean. The westward orientation of most vineyards on the Vaca Mountains also extends the amount of direct sunlight on the grapes. The soil of this AVA is volcanic and very porous which allows it to cool down quickly despite the increased sunlight. This contributes to the balance of acidity that grapes from Atlas Peak vineyards are known to have.

See also 
 Atlas Peak fire

References

American Viticultural Areas of the San Francisco Bay Area
Vaca Mountains
Geography of Napa County, California
1992 establishments in California
American Viticultural Areas